Taylor Square is a public square in Sydney, New South Wales, Australia. Taylor Square is located beside a major road junction, where Oxford Street meets Flinders Street. Taylor Square is also on the border of the suburbs of Darlinghurst and Surry Hills.

Description

Taylor Square sits above the tunnel section of the Eastern Distributor, part of M1. The square is named after Sir Allen Taylor (1864-1940), a timber merchant, ship builder and Lord Mayor of Sydney who was responsible for the widening of Oxford Street during his tenure.

The area formerly bound by the traffic of the three streets is popularly known as "Gilligan's Island" because of three large palm trees that once occupied the strip, but have since been subsequently removed. Construction of the Eastern Distributor also entailed the realignment of traffic flow in the area. Direct vehicle access across Oxford Street via Bourke Street is no longer possible.

The locality is a centre of the city's nightlife, especially for its LGBT community. Two permanent tributes are the large rainbow flag and rainbow crossing, built in 2014 and 2019 respectively.

Darlinghurst Courthouse is an imposing sandstone building on Taylor Square. It was designed by architect Mortimer Lewis (1796 - 1879) in 1844, and has a Greek Revival style facade. The central block is adapted from an 1823 design in Peter Nicholson's The New Practical Builder.

The square also features a large water fountain built into the pavement. This was part of a $5.25 million upgrade, in 2003, including lighting and grass terrace. The fountain is currently being reviewed for upgrade and repair by City of Sydney Council.

See also 
 Taylor Square Substation No. 6 and Underground Conveniences

References

Sydney localities
Streets in Sydney
Gay villages in Australia
LGBT culture in Sydney
Darlinghurst, New South Wales
Squares in Sydney